Umatilla is a city in Lake County, Florida, United States. The population was 3,456 at the 2010 census and an estimated 3,805 in 2018. Umatilla is known as the Gateway to the Ocala National Forest, located in northern Lake County.

History

The city was named after Umatilla, Oregon. In 1998 it was the site of a Mediterranean fruit fly outbreak at the Golden Gem citrus plant.

Geography

Umatilla is in northern Lake County at  (28.933134, –81.664430). Florida State Road 19 passes through the center of town, leading south  to Tavares, the county seat, and north  through the Ocala National Forest to Palatka.

Demographics

As of the census of 2000, there were 2,214 people, 867 households, and 582 families residing in the city. The racial makeup of the city was 93.54% White, 3.52% African American, 0.23% Native American, 0.32% Asian, 0.95% from other races, and 1.45% from two or more races. Hispanic or Latino of any race were 3.93% of the population.

There were 867 households, out of which 29.6% had children under the age of 18 living with them, 49.8% were married couples living together, 13.1% had a female householder with no husband present, and 32.8% were non-families. 28.1% of all households were made up of individuals, and 15.0% had someone living alone who was 65 years of age or older. The average household size was 2.48 and the average family size was 3.01.

In the city, the population was spread out, with 24.3% under the age of 18, 8.4% from 18 to 24, 26.3% from 25 to 44, 20.5% from 45 to 64, and 20.6% who were 65 years of age or older. The median age was 39 years. For every 100 females, there were 89.6 males. For every 100 females age 18 and over, there were 81.1 males.

The median income for a household in the city was $29,628, and the median income for a family was $37,500. Males had a median income of $25,500 versus $21,741 for females. The per capita income for the city was $17,739. About 7.2% of families and 11.9% of the population were below the poverty line, including 13.9% of those under age 18 and 17.9% of those age 65 or over.

Parks and recreation

The city offers many outdoor activities such as boating, fishing, camping and hiking.

Notable people

 Al Hofmann, drag racer and drag car owner in the funny car division
 Jonathan Lucroy, catcher for the Chicago Cubs
 Willis V. McCall, sheriff of Lake County
 Robert M. McTureous, Jr., recipient of the Medal of Honor
 Julia Nesheiwat, United States government official
 Will Radcliff, creator of the Slush Puppie; owned a ranch surrounding Umatilla
 Dennis K. Stanley, professor and coach
 Jaclyn Stapp, beauty queen
 Howard Van Hyning, percussionist with the New York City Opera

References

External links

 
 
 Umatilla at City-Data.com

Cities in Lake County, Florida
Greater Orlando
Cities in Florida